Bedok Stadium is a football stadium located in Bedok, Singapore. The stadium is open daily from 4:30am till 8:30pm to the public, unless it is exclusively booked. The stadium is managed by  Sport Singapore.

It was the home ground for Geylang International FC till 2019.

Facilities & Structures
The stadium has a seating capacity of 3,964 people. (2000 permanent, 1000 semi-permanent & 800 portable). The stadium consists of a soccer field, an 8-lane running track and partial athletic facilities.  It is also part of the Bedok Sports Complex, a community sports facility that includes Bedok Swimming Complex, Bedok Sports Hall, Bedok Fitness Centre and the Bedok Stadium itself.

See also

List of stadiums in Singapore

References

Geylang International FC
Sports venues in Singapore
Football venues in Singapore
Bedok
Singapore Premier League venues